Ian Parks (born 1959) is a British poet, known for his love poetry.

Biography
Described by Chiron Review as 'the finest love poet of his generation', Parks was born in Mexborough, then in the West Riding of Yorkshire. The son of a miner, Parks grew up during the declining years of the industry - something which was to have a profound effect on his later work. His first collection of poems, Gargoyles in Winter was published in 1986, the same year in which he received a Yorkshire Arts Award. From 1986 to 1988 he was writer-in-residence at North Riding College, Scarborough. He was made a Hawthornden Fellow in 1991 and was awarded a Travelling Fellowship to the USA in 1994, spending most of his year in New England. He did research into Chartist poetry in Oxford and was one of the Poetry Society New Poets in 1996. He is the editor of Versions of the North: Contemporary Yorkshire Poetry. He has taught creative writing at the universities of Sheffield, Oxford, Hull, and Leeds and was Writing Fellow at De Montfort University Leicester from 2012-14. He was writer in residence at Gladstone's Library in 2012 and currently runs the Read to Write Project in Doncaster.

His collections include A Climb Through Altered Landscapes (Blackwater, 1998), Shell Island (Waywiser, 2006), The Cage (Flux Gallery Press, 2008), Love Poems 1979-2009 (Flux Gallery Press, 2009) The Landing Stage (Lapwing, Belfast, 2010), The Exile's House (Waterloo, 2012) and Citizens (Smokestack 2017). His poems have appeared in Poetry Review, The Times Literary Supplement, The Observer, The Liberal, Poetry Salzburg Review, The Independent on Sunday, Poetry (Chicago), London Magazine, The Chiron Review, The Rialto, Stand, Acumen, Poetry Greece, Modern Poetry in Translation and have been broadcast on BBC Radio 3. His pamphlet, 'A Paston Letter' was published by Rack Press. A selection of his poems appears in Old City: New Rumours  edited by Carol Rumens and Ian Gregson. His versions of the modern Greek poet Constantine Cavafy - The Cavafy Variations (Rack Press) was published in 2013 and was a Poetry Book Society Choice. If Possible: Cavafy Poems was published by Calder Valley Poetry in 2018 and was shortlisted for the Michael Marks Award; Body, Remember: Cavafy Poems also from Calder Valley, was published in 2019. His Selected Poems of Harold Massingham was published by Calder Valley Poetry in 2021. His work is included in the Folio Society Love Poems edited by Imtiaz Dharker.

'I never started out to be a love poet' Parks states in the preface to his Love Poems 1979-2009 - 'there's never been a point where I've set myself an agenda or a strategy. The love poems have just happened, appearing out of the blue and prompted by circumstances. They called and I responded'.

References

External links
 Interview with Parks by Gladstone's Library
 Interview with Parks in Poetry Magazine

1959 births
Living people
English male poets
People from Mexborough